Pujie (16 April 1907 – 28 February 1994) was a Qing dynasty imperial prince of the Aisin-Gioro. Pujie was the younger brother of Puyi, the last Emperor of China. After the fall of the Qing dynasty, Pujie went to Japan, where he was educated and married to Hiro Saga, a Japanese noblewoman. In 1937, he moved to Manchukuo, where his brother ruled as Emperor under varying degrees of Japanese control during the Second Sino-Japanese War (1937–1945). After the war ended, Pujie was captured by Soviet forces, held in Soviet prison camps for five years, and then extradited back to the People's Republic of China, where he was incarcerated for about 10 years in the Fushun War Criminals Management Centre. He was later pardoned and released from prison by the Chinese government, after which he remained in Beijing where he joined the Communist Party and served in a number of positions in the party until his death in 1994.

Names
Zeng Guofan was a source of inspiration for Pujie's art name, Bingfan. Bingfan means "live up to (the legacy of Zeng Guo)fan".

Early life

Pujie was the second son of Zaifeng (Prince Chun) and his primary consort, Youlan. As a child, he was brought to the Forbidden City in Beijing to be a playmate and classmate to his brother, Puyi. A well-known incident recounted how Puyi threw a tantrum when he saw that the inner lining of one of Pujie's coats was yellow, because yellow was traditionally a colour reserved only for the emperor.

In 1929, Pujie travelled to Japan and was educated in the Gakushūin Peers' School. He became fluent in Japanese. Later, he enrolled at the Imperial Japanese Army Academy and graduated in July 1935.

Pujie was first married in 1924 to a Manchu noblewoman, Tang Shixia, but they had no children. He left his wife behind when he went to Japan, and the marriage was dissolved some years later. After graduating from the Imperial Japanese Army Academy, Pujie agreed to an arranged marriage with a Japanese noblewoman. He selected Hiro Saga, who was a relative of the Japanese imperial family, from a photograph from a number of possible candidates vetted by the Kwantung Army. As Puyi did not have an heir, the wedding had strong political implications, and was aimed at both fortifying relations between the two countries and introducing Japanese blood into the Manchu imperial family.

The engagement ceremony took place at the Manchukuo embassy in Tokyo on 2 February 1937 with the official wedding held in the Imperial Army Hall at Kudanzaka, Tokyo, on 3 April. In October, the couple moved to Hsinking, the capital of Manchukuo, where Puyi was then the Emperor.

Life in Manchukuo
As Puyi had no children, Pujie was regarded as first in line to succeed his brother as the emperor of Manchukuo; the Japanese officially proclaimed him the heir presumptive. However, Pujie was not appointed by his brother as the heir to the throne of the Qing dynasty, as imperial tradition stated that a childless emperor should choose his heir from a subsequent generation instead of from his own generation. While in Manchukuo, Pujie served as honorary head of the Manchukuo Imperial Guards. He returned briefly to Japan in 1944 to attend the Army Staff College.

At the time of the collapse of Manchukuo during the Soviet invasion of Manchuria in August 1945, Pujie initially attempted to escape to Japan with his brother. However, as it became apparent that no escape was possible, he opted to return to Hsinking in an unsuccessful attempt to surrender the city to forces of the Republic of China, rather than have the city fall into foreign hands.

Pujie was arrested by the Soviet Red Army and first sent to a prison camp in Chita, and then to another in Khabarovsk along with his brother and other relatives. He spent about five years in the Soviet prison camps until 1950, when the Sino-Soviet rapprochement allowed him and his fellow captives to be extradited to the newly founded People's Republic of China.

Life in the People's Republic of China
On his return to China, Pujie was incarcerated in the War Criminals Management Centre in Fushun, Liaoning. A model prisoner, he was eventually pardoned and released from prison by the Chinese government in 1960. He joined the Communist Party and served in a number of positions. In 1961 with permission from Chinese premier Zhou Enlai, he was reunited with his wife and younger daughter Husheng and settled in Beijing, while his daughter would later return to Japan and became a citizen there. In 1963, his daughter returned to stay with him and his wife for one year before returning to Japan again.

In 1978, Pujie became a deputy from Shanghai at the 5th National People's Congress. He subsequently served as Vice Chairman of the Nationalities Committee of the 6th National People's Congress in 1983. He was appointed Deputy Head of the China–Japan Friendship Group from 1985. He rose to a seat on the Presidium of the 7th National People's Congress in 1988. From 1986, Pujie was also Honorary Director of the Welfare Fund for Handicapped.

Pujie was also a technical adviser for the 1987 film The Last Emperor directed by Bernardo Bertolucci. On 28 November 1991, he was awarded an honorary Doctor of Law by Ritsumeikan University. He died of illness at 07:55 on 28 February 1994 in Beijing at the age of 87. His body was cremated and half of his ashes were buried at Nakayama Shrine in Shimonoseki, Yamaguchi Prefecture, Japan, while the other half were buried in Beijing.

Family 
 First wife, of the Tatara clan (1904–1993), personal name Shixia
 Second wife, of the Saga clan (16 March 1914 – 20 June 1987), personal name Hiro
 Huisheng (26 February 1938 – 4 December 1957),
 Husheng (b. 13 March 1940),
 Married Kenji of the Japanese Fukunaga clan in 1968, and had issue (three sons, two daughters)

Immediate family
Pujie's first wife was Tang Yiying (唐怡瑩; 1904–1993), who was better known as Tang Shixia (唐石霞). She was from the Manchu Tatara (他他拉) clan, and was the daughter of Zhiqi, a brother of the Guangxu Emperor's concubines Consort Zhen and Consort Jin. Pujie married Tang when he was 17, but did not get along well with her. In 1926, Tang became Zhang Xueliang's mistress and broke ties with Pujie and his family. When Pujie went to Japan for his studies, Tang had another affair – this time with Lu Xiaojia (盧筱嘉), the son of the warlord Lu Yongxiang. She looted Pujie's ancestral house, the Prince Chun Mansion in Beijing. Since then, Pujie and Tang had lived separately until their divorce. In 1949, Tang moved to Hong Kong and became a lecturer at the School of Eastern Languages in the University of Hong Kong.

In 1935, when Pujie returned to China from his studies in Japan, Puyi tried to help his brother find a Manchu wife. Pujie met one Wang Mintong (王敏彤) but they never married.

Pujie eventually married Hiro Saga, a Japanese noblewoman related to the Japanese imperial family, under an arranged marriage. They had two daughters: Huisheng (1938–1957) and Husheng (嫮生; born 1940). Huisheng died on 4 December 1957 at Mount Amagi in Japan in what appeared to be a murder–suicide case, while Husheng married Fukunaga Kenji (福永健治) and became known as "Fukunaga Kosei" after her marriage. The couple had five children.

Ancestry

See also
 Royal and noble ranks of the Qing dynasty
 Imperial Chinese harem system#Qing

References

Bibliography

External links

"The Last Emperor's Brother HUKETSU" (Chiba Prefecture, Japan's English-language page)
Information about TV Asahi's (Japan) Autumn 2003 dramatization of Pujie and Lady Saga Hiro's marriage, Ryuuten no ouhi – Saigo no koutei (流転の王妃・最後の皇弟)

1907 births
1994 deaths
Aisin Gioro
Chinese collaborators with Imperial Japan
Manchu politicians
Manchukuo royalty
People extradited from the Soviet Union
People's Republic of China politicians from Beijing
Prince Chun (醇)
Qing dynasty imperial princes
Non-inheriting heirs presumptive